Hauenstein is a surname. Notable people with the surname include:

Henry Hauenstein (1881–1940), Australian rower and World War I officer
Ralph Hauenstein (1912–2016), American army officer, businessman, and philanthropist

See also
Havenstein